The Women's discus throw athletics events for the 2012 Summer Paralympics took place at the London Olympic Stadium from 31 August to 8 September. A total of 6 events were contested over this distance for 11 different classifications.

Results

F11/12

F35/36

F37

F40

F51/52/53

F57/58

References

Athletics at the 2012 Summer Paralympics
2012 in women's athletics
Women's sport in London